John Francis Way (17 August 1902 – 19 June 1970) was an Australian rules footballer who played with Carlton and Essendon in the Victorian Football League (VFL).

Notes

External links 

Jack Way's profile at Blueseum

1902 births
1970 deaths
Carlton Football Club players
Essendon Football Club players
Australian rules footballers from Melbourne
People from Werribee, Victoria